The Ministry of National Defence is the national executive ministry of the Government of Colombia charged with coordinating and supervising all agencies and functions of the government relating directly to national security and the armed forces of Colombia, similar to the defense ministries in other countries. It is composed of the National Army, Navy, Air Force and the National Police.

Lists of Ministers

List of Ministers of War

List of Ministers of National Defence

References

Footnotes

Citations

 
Colombia
Military of Colombia
Military history of Colombia
National Defence
1965 establishments in Colombia